The 2021–22 SuperLega was the 77th season of the highest tier domestic division in the Italian Men’s Volleyball League system since establishment in 1946. The league organized under the supervision of Federazione Italiana Pallavolo. The season started on 9 October 2021 and concluded on 13 May 2022.

Gioiella Prisma Taranto was promoted to SuperLega after winning the 2020–21 Serie A2. Cucine Lube Civitanova won the SuperLega after a 3–1 series win over Sir Safety Conad Perugia. Tonno Callipo Calabria Vibo Valentia and Consar RCM Ravenna are relegated to Serie A2 in the next season.

Format 
The regular season is composed of 13 teams and played as a total of 24 matches round-robin tournament. Each regular season match week, 12 teams will play and one will rest. Each team will play twice against every other team (half at home and half away). At the completion of the regular season, the eight best teams advanced to the championship play–offs and the teams ending in 12th and 13th are relegated to Serie A2 in the next season.

The eight best teams in the standings of regular season gain access to the Quarterfinals in the Championship play–offs with the classic pairing system (1st vs 8th, 2nd vs 7th, 3rd vs 6th and 4th vs 5th). Quarterfinals will play in Best–of–Three series, while semifinals and final will play in Best–of–Five series. The best seeded team will gain home field advantage and home courts are switched after every match. The top three teams in the final standing as per the Teams Ranking System (including result of the regular season) qualified for the 2022–23 CEV Champions League and the 4th place team qualified for the 2022–23 CEV Cup.

The four teams eliminated from Quarterfinals in the Championship play–offs will participate in 5th place play–offs with the teams finishing in 9th and 10th at the end of regular season. Preliminary round will play as a total of 5 matches round-robin tournament, the top four teams advanced to the final four. Semifinals and final will play in a single match on the court of best seeded team. The winner of the 5th place play–offs qualified for the 2022–23 CEV Cup.

The top four teams of the final standing also qualified for the Super Cup 2022 tournament.

Teams

Squads

In the current season rules, Each teams involved in the tournament were required to register 14-player roster must be selected in each match. There’s no limit of foreign players in the each team’s roster but it must have at least 3 Italian players on the court at all times.

Transfer players

Pool standing procedure
 Highest number of result points, the teams will be ranked by the most point gained per match as follows:
 Match won 3–0 or 3–1: 3 points for the winner, 0 points for the loser
 Match won 3–2: 2 points for the winner, 1 point for the loser
 Match forfeited: 3 points for the winner, 0 points (0–25, 0–25, 0–25) for the loser
 In the event of a tie, the following first tiebreaker will apply: total number of victories (matches won, matches lost)
 If teams are still tied after examining the most point gained and the number of victories, then will examine the results in order to break the tie in the following order:
 Set quotient: if two or more teams are tied on the number of points gained, they will be ranked by the quotient resulting from the division of the number of all set won by the number of all sets lost.
 Points quotient: if the tie persists based on the set quotient, the teams will be ranked by the quotient resulting from the division of all points scored by the total of points lost during all sets.
 If the tie persists based on the point quotient, the tie will be broken based on the team that won the match of the Round Robin Phase between the tied teams. When the tie in point quotient is between three or more teams, these teams ranked taking into consideration only the matches involving the teams in question.

Regular season
 All times are local, CEST (UTC+02:00) between 10 and 30 October and CET (UTC+01:00) from 31 October.

League table

Results table

Fixtures and results

Leg 1
Matchday 1

Matchday 2

Matchday 3

Matchday 4

Matchday 5

Matchday 6

Matchday 7

Matchday 8

Matchday 9

Matchday 10

Matchday 11

Matchday 12

Matchday 13

Leg 2
Matchday 14

Matchday 15

Matchday 16

Matchday 17

Matchday 18

Matchday 19

Matchday 20

Matchday 21

Matchday 22

Matchday 23

Matchday 24

Matchday 25

Matchday 26

Championship play–offs
 All times are local, Central European Summer Time (UTC+02:00).
Bracket

Quarterfinals

Semifinals

Final

5th place play–offs

Preliminary round
 All times are local, Central European Summer Time (UTC+02:00).

League table

Fixtures and results
Matchday 1

Matchday 2

Matchday 3

Matchday 4

Matchday 5

5th–8th places
 All times are local, Central European Summer Time (UTC+02:00).
Bracket

5th–8th semifinals

5th place match

Final standings

Awards

Best Player of the Month
 Credem Banca MVP of October:  Georg Grozer
 Credem Banca MVP of November:  Mattia Bottolo
 Credem Banca MVP of December:  Nimir Abdel-Aziz
 Credem Banca MVP of January:  Francesco Recine
 Credem Banca MVP of February:  Rok Možič
 Credem Banca MVP of the Quarterfinals:  Alessandro Michieletto
 Credem Banca MVP of the Semifinals:  Luciano De Cecco
 Credem Banca MVP of the Finals:  Robertlandy Simón

Awards of the Season

Best coach
 Angelo Lorenzetti (Itas Trentino)
Best U–23 Player
 Alessandro Michieletto (Itas Trentino)
Best Scorer
 Rok Možič (Verona Volley)
Best Receiver
 Alessandro Piccinelli (Sir Safety Conad Perugia)
Best Server
 Gabi Garcia Fernandez (Cucine Lube Civitanova)
 Wilfredo León (Sir Safety Conad Perugia)
Best Spiker
 Wilfredo León (Sir Safety Conad Perugia)
 Rok Možič (Verona Volley)
Best Middle Blocker
 Robertlandy Simón (Cucine Lube Civitanova)
Best Blocker
 Matteo Piano (Allianz Milano)
Best Referee 
 Andrea Puecher
Best Press Officer
 Gian Paolo Maini (Leo Shoes PerkinElmer Modena)

Growth of the league
The data of the Sponsor Value research by StageUp and Ipsos highlight the great growth of the top volleyball league. At the end of the 2021/22 season, the pool of people interested in the volleyball SuperLega, the top men's championship, is 15,419,000 people. The number reflects an increase of +8.8% compared to November 2021, and even 3.7 million units compared to May 2020. In the same research, the most interested league in Italy is Serie A football which reached 28 million people.

Statistics leaders

Regular season
The stats are officially checked by the Federazione Italiana Pallavolo from 7 p.m. (local time) of the day after the last match. The table below shows the top 10 ranked players in each skill plus top scorers '''as of March 24, 2022.

Best Scorers

Best Spikers

Best Blockers

Best Servers

Best Setters

Best Diggers

Best Receivers

References

External links
Official website (English)
Official website (Italian)

Men's volleyball competitions in Italy
Italy
SuperLega
SuperLega